Sosatie (pl sosaties) is a traditional South African dish of meat (usually lamb or mutton) cooked on skewers. The term derives from sate ("skewered meat") and saus (spicy sauce). It is of Cape Malay origin, used in Afrikaans, the primary language of the Cape Malays, and the word has gained greater circulation in South Africa. Marinated, cubed meat (usually lamb) is skewered and cooked by braaing (barbecued) shish-kebab style. Sosatie recipes vary, but commonly the ingredients can include cubes of lamb, beef, chicken, dried apricots, red onions and mixed peppers.

Preparation
To prepare,  mutton chunks are marinated overnight in fried onions, chillies, garlic, curry leaves and tamarind juice, then threaded on skewers and either pan-fried or grilled. However, the most common way to cook the sosaties is outside, on a braai (or barbecue). The meat chunks are often interspersed with small onions, sliced peppers, dried apricots or prunes.

See also
 List of African dishes
 List of lamb dishes

Similar dishes

Anticuchos - Peru and other Andean states
Arrosticini - Italy (Abruzzo)
Brochette - France, Spain (Catalonia)
Chuanr - China
City chicken - United States
Espetada - Portugal
Frigărui - Romania
Kabab torsh - Iran
Kebakko - Finland
Khorovats - Armenia
Kkochi - Korea
Pinchitos - Spain (Andalusia and Extremadura)
Ražnjići - Balkans
Satay - Indonesia, Malaysia, Singapore, Brunei, Thailand,France and the Netherlands
Shashlik - Caucasus and Central Asia
Souvlaki - Greece
Shish kebab - Turkey, Middle East, and South Asia
Suya - Nigeria
Yakitori - Japan

References

Lamb dishes
Grilled skewers
South African cuisine